Aeroflot Flight 2022 was a scheduled Soviet domestic passenger flight between Vilnius Airport in Lithuanian SSR and Vnukovo International Airport in Moscow, Russian SFSR, Soviet Union that crashed on 16 December 1973, killing all 51 people on board. The five hundred mile flight suffered a loss of control as a result of a malfunction of its elevator, causing it to crash as it made its final descent into Moscow. At the time of the crash it was the worst accident in aviation history involving a Tupolev Tu-124, since it entered service with Aeroflot in 1962.

Aircraft 
The aircraft involved in the accident was a Tupolev Tu-124V, registered СССР-45061, to Aeroflot. The Tu-124V was a variant of the original Tu-124 which had been introduced in 1962. The 'V' variant of the Tu-124 modified the aircraft to be able to seat 56 passengers, instead of the original 44, and also had increased range and payload capacity. СССР-45061 was equipped with two Soloviev D-20P turbofan engines and had first flown in 1964. It was assigned to Aeroflot's Lithuania division. At the time of the accident, the aircraft had sustained 14,903 flight hours and 13,832 pressurization cycles.

Crew and passengers
Six crew members were aboard Aeroflot Flight 2022. The flight crew consisted of:
 Captain Stepan Boyko
 Co-pilot Eugenijus Karnila 
 Navigator Juozas Časas
 Flight engineer Yuno Shamaev
 Stewardess Maria Cricova

The crew also included a junior police lieutenant as a sky marshal (they were added after the hijacking of Aeroflot Flight 244 in 1970).

All of the passengers were Soviet citizens, with the exception of one who was a West German citizen. Majority of the passengers were Lithuanians. They included four noted Lithuanian pediatricians, including , who traveled to a medical conference in Kharkiv. Bodies of the victims were cremated in Moscow on 21 December. The four doctors were buried in a public ceremony attended by Lithuanian First Secretary Antanas Sniečkus in Antakalnis Cemetery.

Accident
At 18:10 MSK on 16 December 1973, СССР-45061 took off from Vilnius Airport in Lithuania SSR and proceeded east on a flight to Moscow-Vnukovo Airport in Russia with six crew and 45 passengers on board. At 19:11 MSK the pilots reported the aircraft had entered a steep dive and were having difficulties recovering. At 19:13 MSK the aircraft crashed into the ground near the village of Karacharovo, northwest of Moscow. All 51 people aboard the aircraft were killed. At the time of the crash, visibility was reported to be 2-4 kilometers with haze and cloudy skies.

Cause
An investigation ruled out engine problems or weather having playing a part in the crash. In addition, there were no physical jams in the aircraft's rudder, aileron, and wing trim tab components. Investigators determined that a spontaneous short circuit had caused the elevator trim tab to deflect to and maintain an upward position. As a result, the pilots lost horizontal control and entered into an irrecoverable dive.

See also

Aeroflot Flight 8641
Northwest Airlines Flight 85
United Airlines Flight 585
1966 Felthorpe Trident crash

References  

Aviation accidents and incidents in 1973
Aviation accidents and incidents in the Soviet Union
2022
1973 in the Soviet Union
Accidents and incidents involving the Tupolev Tu-124
December 1973 events in Europe
Transport disasters in Moscow